Singapore is a very small, heavily urbanised, island city-state in Southeast Asia, located at the end of the Malayan Peninsula between Malaysia and Indonesia.

The Singapore area comprises mainland and other islands. These figures are based on  High Water Mark cadastral survey boundaries.

Singapore is separated from Indonesia by the Singapore Strait and from Malaysia by the Straits of Johor.

Topography

Singapore's main territory is a diamond-shaped island, although its territory includes surrounding smaller islands. The farthest outlying island is Pedra Branca. Of Singapore's dozens of smaller islands, Jurong Island, Pulau Tekong, Pulau Ubin and Sentosa are the larger ones. Most of Singapore is no more than 15 metres above sea level.

The highest point of Singapore is Bukit Timah Hill, with a height from ground of 165 m (538 ft) and made up of igneous rock, granite. Hills and valleys of sedimentary rock dominate the northwest, while the eastern region consists of sandy and flatter land. Singapore has no natural lakes, but reservoirs and water catchment areas have been constructed to store fresh water for Singapore's water supply.

Singapore has reclaimed land with earth obtained from its own hills, the seabed, and neighbouring countries. As a result, Singapore's land area has grown from 581.5 km² in the 1960s to 725.7 km² today, and will increase slightly more due to construction of sea polder and barrage to deal with the ever rising sea level.

Climate

Singapore is one-and-a-half degrees north of the equator, lying entirely between the 1st and 2nd parallels. Singapore's climate is classified as tropical rainforest climate (Köppen climate classification Af), with no true distinct seasons. Owing to its geographical location and maritime exposure, its climate is characterized by uniform temperature and pressure, high humidity and abundant rainfall. Therefore, it is almost always warm and wet.

May is the hottest month of the year in Singapore, followed by June. This is due to light winds and strong sunshine during those months. Temperature often goes above  and can reach  at times.

Relative humidity has a diurnal range in the high 90s in the early morning to around 60% in the mid-afternoon, but does go below 50% at times. During prolonged heavy rain, relative humidity often reaches 100%. Generally, there is much more rainfall on the western side of the island than on the eastern portion of Singapore, owing to a rain shadow effect.

Thus, the eastern side of Singapore is much drier and slightly hotter than western Singapore. This can cause slight weather disparities from one side of the island to the other. This is significant to note because even a small hill such as Bukit Timah Hill can cause this phenomenon. Despite Singapore's small size, there may be sunshine on one side while there is rain on the other.

Further contrasts that prevent true all-year uniformity are the monsoon seasons which happen twice each year. The first one is the Northeast Monsoon which occurs from mid-November to early March. The second is the Southwest Monsoon season which occurs from June to September. Periods between monsoon seasons receive less rain and wind. During the Northeast Monsoon, northeast winds prevail, sometimes reach . There are cloudy conditions in December and January with frequent afternoon showers.

Spells of widespread moderate to heavy rain occur lasting from 1 to 3 days at a stretch. It is relatively dry in February till early March although rainfall still exceeds 120mm. It is also generally windy with wind speeds sometimes reaching  in the months of January and February. During the Southwest Monsoon season, southeast winds prevail. Isolated to scattered showers occur in the late morning and early afternoon. Early morning "Sumatras" – squall lines that originate over nearby Sumatra – are common.

Climate change initiatives

Singapore recognises that climate change in the decades ahead will have major implications for the island-nation. It has taken a three-prong approach to the issue - researching how the nation will be affected in specific details, implementing mitigation measures and adapting to the coming changes. For the research, a Centre for Climate Research Singapore (CCRS) has been established.

The government estimates that $100 billion will need to be spent over a 100-year time frame to address the issue. In the 2020 budget, it has  set aside an initial $5 billion dollars towards a Coastline and Flood Protection Fund.
 For the population, it will provide incentives for owners to convert to electric vehicles (EVs), like rebates on the Additional Registration fees and expanding the EV charging network. By 2040, it expects to phase out petrol and diesel (internal combustion engine) vehicles. The country's transport policy continues to focus on a "car-lite" future with most commuters using public transportation (MRT trains, buses, taxis) instead.

Singapore is the first country in Southeast Asia to levy a carbon tax, at $5 per ton, applicable for its largest carbon-emitting corporations that produce more than 25,000 tons of carbon dioxide per year. To reduce the country's dependence on fossil fuels, it is building one of the world's largest floating solar farm at Tengeh Reservoir in Tuas, with a capacity of 60MW.

Time zone

Although Singapore does not observe daylight saving time (DST), it follows the UTC+8 time zone, one hour ahead of the typical zone for its geographical location.

Geology

Igneous rocks are found in Bukit Timah and Woodlands and Pulau Ubin island. Granite makes up the bulk of the igneous rock. Gabbro is also found in the area and is found in an area called Little Guilin named for its resemblance to Guilin in Southern China. This area is in Bukit Gombak. Sedimentary rocks are found on the western part of Singapore and is mainly made of sandstone and mudstones. It also includes the southwestern area. Metamorphic rocks are found in the northeastern part of Singapore and also on Pulau Tekong off the east coast of Singapore. The rocks are mainly made up of quartzite and also make up the Sajahat Formation.

Seismic activity
Singapore is relatively safe from seismic activity in the region, as the nearest major active faults (Sumatran fault and Sunda megathrust fault) are hundreds of kilometres away in Indonesia. However, the population and buildings are prone to being only very slightly affected by any activity as tremors, which is not uncommon, but generally does not do any harm and is limited to small amounts of swaying or vibration of objects.

In late 2004, several parts of Asia and Africa were struck by the 2004 Indian Ocean earthquake and the resulting tsunami. Singapore was fortunate as it was protected by the Sumatra landmass, which bore the brunt of the tsunami; the effect on Singapore was limited to tremors felt in some of the common high-rise buildings there.

Political and human geography

When Singapore was first colonized by the British, the City of Singapore was situated on the southern coast, around the mouth of the Singapore River. This area remains the Central Area of Singapore. The rest of the island was farmland and primary rainforest. However, since the 1960s the government has constructed many new towns in other areas, so that today the island is nearly entirely built-up and urbanised, with only a few exceptions, such as the district of Lim Chu Kang or reclaimed land in the process of being developed.

The country has several subdivisions, mostly used for administrative or statistical purposes. Politically, Singapore is divided into five administrative districts, these are then further subdivided into town councils which usually consists of one or more political constituencies. However, unlike other countries where local government subdivisions are used to cite locations, the same practice is often uncommon in Singapore. Political boundaries fluctuate with every general election and thus, the areas they cover do not necessarily correspond to the local perception of a place. Most geographical regions, districts and neighbourhoods within the city-state are usually overlapping and can sometimes be arbitrarily defined. Planning and census boundaries, called planning areas, have been used by the Urban Redevelopment Authority to define certain districts and neighbourhoods, although these boundaries may not necessarily correspond with the common perception of a certain place. While boundaries for new towns do exist, there have been instances where certain neighbourhoods can be identified separately from the town it is located in. Tiong Bahru for example, is often identified separately from the HDB town it is a part of, Bukit Merah.

As the main government agency responsible for the urban planning of Singapore, the Urban Redevelopment Authority seeks to implement efficient land use and minimise pollution while maintaining convenient transport, which are Singapore's largest concerns because of its situation as a city-state. A Development Guide Plan for each of the 55 planning areas has been released in the process.

In order to reduce traffic congestion, Electronic road pricing (ERP) has been enacted around entrances into the Central Area. The other parts of Singapore are less dense and busy, and are often filled with housing estates such as from the Housing and Development Board (HDB) or condominiums, and commercial districts are less concentrated. However, to reduce strain on the Central Area, several regional centres have been developed, each containing a concentrated commercial district.

Light industry tends to be distributed around the island as industrial estates and located in flats, similar to the HDB, and only allow tenants which produce close to nil pollution, whereas heavy industry tends to be located around Jurong and Jurong Island. A list of such estates can be found here.

There are two connections to the state of Johor, Malaysia. In the north there is a causeway for both rail and road traffic, which connects to the city of Johor Bahru. In the west there is a road bridge (Tuas Second Link), which connects to Johor, for road traffic only. The connections are an important economic link to Malaysia, which can be seen as a hinterland.

The causeway (1,038 m in length) was designed by Coode, Fizmaurice, Wilson and Mitchell of Westminster and constructed by Topham, Jones & Railton Ltd of London. It was started in 1909 as a railway link by Johor State Railway to connect Johor Bahru to Singapore, then the administrative headquarters of British interests in Southeast Asia. Construction of the road section started in 1919 and completed in 1923.

The causeway has caused ecological problems, most notably accumulation of silt in the Johore Strait. This has led to disagreements with Malaysia. Singapore has rejected Malaysia's proposal to replace the causeway with a bridge, and Malaysia has since proposed the idea of what became known as "the crooked half-bridge", descending halfway to link up with the low-level causeway.

Since Singapore lacks natural freshwater rivers and lakes, the primary source of domestic water is rainfall. Demand for fresh water is approximately twice that supplied by rainfall, so Singapore imports much of its fresh water from Malaysia and Indonesia. To lessen its reliance on imports, Singapore has built reservoirs to collect rainwater from both forest catchment and urban catchment run-offs and from recycled water facilities. In addition, Singapore has built three desalination plants on the western coast of Tuas with two more under construction. They are expected to at least meet 30% of Singapore's water demands in 2060. Recent plans to produce NEWater-recycled water from treatment by filtration via reverse osmosis have been very successful as the government has opened up three plants around the island to help meet the demand.

There are more than 300 parks and 4 nature reserves in Singapore. There are also many trees planted, and almost fifty per cent of the country is covered by greenery. Because of this, Singapore is also commonly known as the 'Garden City'.

Singapore remains highly vulnerable to the impact of climate change; in particular, the rising sea levels may pose a major threat to the very survival of the country in the long-term perspective.

See also

 Links between Singapore and Johor

References

External links

 Meteorological Services Singapore
 Singapore Weather Forecast
 Climatology of Singapore – National Environment Agency
 CNN.com – Weather – Singapore
 Maps:
 http://www.worldexecutive.com/cityguides/singapore/maps.html
 http://www.urbanrail.net/as/sing/singapore.htm
 http://go.hrw.com/atlas/norm_htm/singapor.htm

 

bn:সিঙ্গাপুর#ভূগোল